Langville is an unincorporated community in Jefferson County, in the U.S. state of Pennsylvania.

History
Langville was named in 1850 for John Lang, the owner of a local woolen mill. A post office called Langville was established in 1886, and remained in operation until 1918.

References

Unincorporated communities in Jefferson County, Pennsylvania
Unincorporated communities in Pennsylvania